John Amplas (born June 23, 1949) is an American actor known primarily for his work with director George A. Romero, particularly his appearances in the title role of Martin (1977), as well as Dawn of the Dead (1978) and Creepshow (1982).

Biography
Amplas's first film with George A. Romero was the cult film Martin (1978), in which he played the title role of a man who believes himself to be a vampire. The character of Martin was initially an older man but after Romero saw Amplas in a Pittsburgh production of Philemon he decided to rewrite the part to suit Amplas and cast him in the role.

Thereafter, he appeared in a number of other films directed by Romero, including Dawn of the Dead (1978), Knightriders (1981), Creepshow (1982), and Day of the Dead (1985), as well as Toxic Zombies (1980), and Midnight (1982), directed by John Russo.

He acted in a horror concept teaser entitled The Three (2011) directed by filmmaker Scott Goldberg which also features co-lead from Day of the Dead Lori Cardille. He starred also in the feature film adaption of the Rob Steigert short film Ombis.

Filmography

References

Sources

External links

Tea Time with Martin: An Interview with John Amplas - March 2011
Interview with John Amplas, November 2010
Interview with John Amplas, May 2011

1949 births
American male film actors
Living people
Point Park University faculty